Raidih is a village in the Raidih CD block in the Gumla subdivision of the Gumla district in the Indian state of Jharkhand.

Geography

Location                         
Raidih is located at

Area overview 
The map alongside presents a rugged area, consisting partly of flat-topped hills called pat and partly of an undulating plateau, in the south-western portion of Chota Nagpur Plateau. Three major rivers – the Sankh, South Koel and North Karo - along with their numerous tributaries, drain the area. The hilly area has large deposits of Bauxite. 93.7% of the population lives in rural areas.

Note: The map alongside presents some of the notable locations in the district. All places marked in the map are linked in the larger full screen map.

Civic administration   
There is a police station at Raidih.   
The headquarters of Raidih block CD block are located at Raidih village.

Demographics 
According to the 2011 Census of India, Raidih had a total population of 770, of which 393 (51%) were males and 393 (49%) were females. Population in the age range 0–6 years was 111. The total number of literate persons in Raidih was 487 (73.90% of the population over 6 years).

(*For language details see Raidih block#Language and religion)

Education
S.S. High School Raidih is a Hindi-medium coeducational institution established in 1961. It has facilities for teaching from class VIII to class XII. The school has a playground, a library with 600 books and has 2 computers for teaching and learning purposes.

Kasturba Gandhi Balika Vidyalaya is a Hindi-medium girls only institution established in 2007. It has facilities for teaching from class VI to class XII. The school has a playground, a library with 574 books and has 5 computers for learning and teaching purposes.

Project Girls High School is a Hindi-medium girls only institution established in 1984. It has facilities for teaching in class VIII to class X. The school has a playground.

References 

Villages in Gumla district